The 2008–09 Copa del Rey was the 107th staging of the Copa del Rey (including two seasons where two rival editions were played). The competition started on 23 August 2008 and concluded on 13 May 2009 with the final, held at the Mestalla Stadium in Valencia, in which Barcelona lifted the trophy for the 25th time in their history with a 4–1 victory over Athletic Bilbao, who qualified for the third qualifying round of the 2009–10 UEFA Europa League. The defending cup holders were Valencia, but they were eliminated in the quarter-finals.

Qualified teams
The following teams competed in the 2008–09 Copa del Rey:

20 teams of 2007–08 La Liga:

Almería
Athletic Bilbao
Atlético Madrid
Barcelona
Betis
Deportivo
Espanyol
Getafe
Levante
Mallorca
Real Murcia
Osasuna
Racing Santander
Real Madrid
Recreativo
Sevilla
Valencia
Valladolid
Villarreal
Zaragoza

21 teams of 2007–08 Segunda División (Sevilla Atlético are excluded for being a reserve team of Sevilla):

Alavés
Albacete
Cádiz
Castellón
Celta Vigo
Córdoba
Eibar
Elche
Gimnàstic
Granada 74
Hércules
Las Palmas
Málaga
Numancia
Poli Ejido
Racing Ferrol
Real Sociedad
Salamanca
Sporting de Gijón
Tenerife
Xerez

24 teams of 2007–08 Segunda División B. Teams that qualified are the top five teams of each of the 4 groups (excluding reserve teams) and the four with the highest number of points out of the remaining non-reserve teams (*):

Pontevedra
Rayo Vallecano
Fuerteventura
Lugo
Universidad LPGC
Ponferradina
Huesca
Zamora
Barakaldo
Real Unión
Girona
Melilla*
Gavà
Alicante
Benidorm
Orihuela
Écija
Ceuta
Linares
Mérida
Granada
Conquense*
Lemona*
Águilas*

18 teams of Tercera División 2007–08. Teams that qualified are the champions of each of the 18 groups (or at least the ones with the highest number of points within their group since reserve teams are excluded):

Ciudad de Santiago
Real Oviedo
Gimnástica
Portugalete
Sant Andreu
Alzira
Ciempozuelos
Mirandés
Roquetas
San Fernando
Atlético Baleares
Atlético Granadilla
Atlético Ciudad
Don Benito
Izarra
Alfaro
Ejea
Toledo

First round
The matches were played on 23, 25, 26, 27 and 28 August 2008.

|}

Second round
The matches were played on 3, 4 and 11 September 2008. Albacete received a bye.

|}

Third round
The matches were played on 8 and 9 October 2008. Real Murcia received a bye.

|}

Final phase bracket
Team listed first play home in the first leg.

Round of 32
The first leg matches were played on 28, 29 and 30 October while the second legs were played on 11, 12 and 13 November 2008.

|}

Round of 16
The first leg matches were played on 6, 7 and 8 January while the second legs were played on 14 and 15 January 2009.

|}

Quarter-finals

|}

First legs

Second legs

Mallorca won 1–0 on aggregate.

Athletic Bilbao won 2–1 on aggregate.

Sevilla 4–4 Valencia on aggregate. Sevilla won on away goals.

Barcelona won 3–2 on aggregate.

Semi-finals

|}

First legs

Second legs

Athletic Bilbao won 4–2 on aggregate.

Barcelona won 3–1 on aggregate.

Final

Top goalscorers
Source:

References

External links
 lfp.es 
 marca.com 
 rfef.es 

Copa del Rey seasons
1